The Polish minority in Ireland numbered approximately 122,515 (2.57% of the population) according to 2016 census figures.

History 

After Poland joined the European Union in May 2004, Ireland was one of three existing EU members to open its borders to Polish workers (the others being the United Kingdom and Sweden). Ireland quickly became a key destination for Poles wishing to work outside the country; in 2004 a website advertising Irish jobs in Polish received over 170,000 hits in its first day.

In the period immediately following the 2008 economic downturn, the number of Polish people in Ireland declined, with some reports suggesting that 30,000 were leaving Ireland per year, and the Central Statistics Office reporting a decrease in the number of Polish people applying for PPS numbers.

Polish people living in Ireland can vote in Polish elections. On Election Day there are special ballot stations provided in Belfast, Cork, and Limerick as well as in the country's embassy in Dublin. Consequently, Polish political parties campaign in Ireland for electoral support.

Language and media 
As of 2021, Polish is officially an established Senior Cycle subject in post-primary education(Senior Cycle subjects: Polish) and hence can be taken as part of the Irish Leaving Certificate examination.

The biggest Polish umbrella organization is the Polish Educational Society in Ireland (PESI), a non-profit organisation established in 2012. PESI sponsors Polish supplementary schools in Ireland and widely cooperates with Polish government bodies and organisations working for the maintenance and promotion of the Polish language abroad.

The large number of Poles in Ireland led to the provision of a number of media outlets catering to them. Newspapers: Polska Gazeta and a section in Dublin's Evening Herald entitled "Polski Herald". Dublin cable television channel, City Channel, also features a programme aimed at Poles in Ireland entitled Oto Polska (This is Poland).

Online media in Ireland include:
 Gazeta.ie - the website with advertisements 
 Nasz Głos - the official website of "Nasz Głos" The Free Polish Weekly 
 Galway.pl - the largest website of the Polish community in the West of Ireland
 Nadajemy.ie - the biggest social networking website for Polish people in Ireland
 Mycork.org - the first Polish forum in Ireland and website of the Polish community in Cork
 Polish-chaplaincy.ie - a website of Polish chaplaincy in Dublin
 Polish Lutherans - a website for Polish Lutherans in Ireland
 ABC EduLibrary- Polish cultural centre and library in Cork
 Together-Razem Centre - non-profit organisation supporting Poles, Central and Eastern Europeans

Notable people

 Stan Gebler Davies, journalist
 Paddy Ruschitzko, hurler

See also 

 Ireland–Poland relations
 Polonia
 Soupy Norman
Prawo Jazdy (alleged criminal)

References 

Ireland
Ethnic groups in Ireland